Octogesima adveniens (The eightieth anniversary) is the incipit of the 14 May 1971 Apostolic Letter addressed by Pope Paul VI to Cardinal Maurice Roy, president of the Pontifical Council for the Laity and of the Pontifical Council for Justice and Peace, on the occasion of the eightieth anniversary of Pope Leo XIII's encyclical Rerum novarum. Generally known as A Call to Action on the Eightieth Anniversary of Rerum novarum, it is an Apostolic Letter which discusses themes such as securing democratic foundations in society.

Content
Octogesima adveniens commemorates the eightieth anniversary of Rerum novarum. Pope Paul discusses the role of individual Christians and local churches in responding to situations of injustices. In this he follows Pius XI, who issued the 1931 social encyclical Quadragesimo anno (Forty years). Pope John Paul II would do likewise in his 1991 Centesimus annus (Hundredth year).

Flagrant inequalities exist in the economic, cultural and political development of the nations: while some regions are heavily industrialized, others are still at the agricultural stage; while some countries enjoy prosperity, others are struggling against starvation; while some peoples have a high standard of culture, others are still engaged in eliminating illiteracy.

Sections 8 through 21 address particular social concerns, most especially the effect of increased urbanization: "Is sufficient attention being devoted to the arrangement and improvement of the life of the country people, whose inferior and at times miserable economic situation provokes the flight to the unhappy crowded conditions of the city outskirts, where neither employment nor housing awaits them?"

A Call to Action
In his 1967 encyclical, Populorum progressio ("On the Development of Peoples") Pope Paul said, "...lay people must consider it their task to improve the temporal order. While the hierarchy has the role of teaching and authoritatively interpreting the moral laws and precepts that apply in this matter, the laity have the duty of using their own initiative and taking action in this area—without waiting passively for directives and precepts from others." He reiterates this his Apostolic Letter, Octogesima adveniens, "Let each one examine himself, to see what he has done up to now, and what he ought to do. It is not enough to recall principles, state intentions, point to crying injustice and utter prophetic denunciations; these words will lack real weight unless they are accompanied for each individual by a livelier awareness of personal responsibility and by effective action."

The Pope noted that socialism may seem to have much in common with Christian belief and it is easy to idealise it as ‘a will for
justice, solidarity and equality’, but, he said that it would be "illusory and dangerous" to accept Marxist analysis "while failing to note the kind of totalitarian and violent society to which this process leads".

The Apostolic Letter is one of the first magisterial documents to mention explicitly  the topic of the preservation of environment. Emphasising the ecclesial doctrine to which the goods of the Earth are dedicated to all people (no. 43), Paul VI criticizes the modern practices of exploiting nature. Each property, including the gifts of nature, stands under the principle of the common use (usus communis), from which no human being must be excluded. Unlike Leo XIII’s encyclical Rerum novarum, Paul VI extends this postulate also on the natural environment and stresses the responsibility for future generations (no. 47). Thereby, Octogesima adveniens anticipates central motifs of the sustainability principle.

References

External links
 Complete text from the official Vatican website.

1971 documents
1971 in Christianity
Documents of the Catholic Social Teaching tradition
Documents of Pope Paul VI